Estonia competed at the World Games 2022 in Birmingham, United States, from 7 July 2022 to 17 July 2022.

Competitors
The following is the list of number of Estonian competitors in the Games.

Archery

Estonia competed in archery.

Dance sport

Estonia competed in dance sport.

Standard dance – Ilia Rotar/Silvia Susanne Barjabin

Orienteering

Estonia competed in orienteering.

Hannula-Katrin Pandis
Sergei Rjabõškin
Sigrid Ruul
Timo Sild

Men's sprint
Men's middle distance
Women's sprint
Women's middle distance
Mixed sprint relay

Sumo

Estonia competed in sumo.

References 

Nations at the 2022 World Games
World Games
2022